The following is a list of works by French sculptor Jean-Baptiste Claude Eugène Guillaume.

Works in cathedrals and churches

Beaux-arts de Paris, l'école nationale supérieure

Guillaume was a pupil of the school and won the 1845 Prix de Rome. Several of his works are held in the school's collection.

Works in the Musée d'Orsay

Public works in Paris

Works in The Louvre

Studies of Napoleon

Miscellaneous

Public works outside of Paris

Works in museums outside of Paris

The museum at Montbard

The Musée des Beaux-arts de Montbard hold several pieces by Guillaume including a bust of Beethoven and copies of "The Reaper" and the "Gracchi". They also hold a Guillaume bust of Pierre-Simon Laplace the scientist.

Gallery of images

References

Lists of sculptures